The Shelby GLH-S was a limited production series of two sport compact automobiles from the mid-1980s.  The main differentiator of these cars from their regular Dodge versions was their use of what would become the intercooled Turbo II engine as well as Shelby Centurian wheels, Koni Adjustable shocks/struts, and changes to the alignment.

1986 

The 1986 Shelby Omni GLH-S was a modified Dodge Omni GLH, with  changes made at the Shelby factory. They were retitled as Shelby Automobiles cars sold at select Dodge dealerships. GLH stood for "Goes Like Hell" and GLH-S stood for Goes Like Hell S'more.

Just 500 were made. Dash plaques using a three-digit serial numbering system were installed.
 
The Turbo I engine was modified with pre-production pieces from what would become the Turbo II inline-four engine. These changes included an intercooler, plus other changes to produce  and a flat 175 ft·lbf (237 N·m) torque curve.  Not included were any of the durability changes to the short block (forged crank, full floating pin, stouter connecting rods, etc.) of the 1987 Chrysler Turbo II engine.  Luckily, the Shelby engines have proved to be reliable even without the durability enhancements of the production Turbo II.  Performance was impressive, with just 6.5 s needed for 0–60 mph (97 km/h) and 14.8 s for the quarter mile (402 m) run. Top speed was 135  mph (217 km/h).

Shelby Automobiles received the first T-2 induction pieces (prior to Dodge/Chrysler), and installed them on the 500 GLH cars that shipped to the Whittier factory.
Engine mods. included:
New T-2 fuel rail, T-2 injectors, wiring harness, larger throttle body, bigger turbo, tuned intake & exhaust manifolds, intercooler/rad. & fan assemblies, induction hoses, T-2 airbox, GLH-S specific logic module, CS-Shelby-CS  windshield decal, & tape graphics pkg. There was a Dodge emblem left on in production.
A black/yellow overlay sticker was placed at the bottom of the speedometer to read to 135 mph .
A Momo leather-wrapped shifter knob, Izumi leather-wrapped steering wheel, and shift pattern sticker were also installed.
A Use Mobil 1 As Recommended in Shelby GLHS Owner's Manual plaque was affixed to the front of the standard production valve cover.

The primary differences between the Shelby engine and the Chrysler Turbo II engine are the torque: Shelby's unique engine computer shaved the torque to save the stock Omni transaxle, Chrysler Turbo II engines had  of torque; the trimetal bearings, forged crank and extra oil passages weren't present; and the wiring harness is a conglomeration of original Turbo I, with splicings for the heated oxygen sensor.

All-in-all this was a very formidable car, especially on short tracks. In SCCA Solo competition, it was never allowed a place in the stock categories because it failed to meet the required 1000 unit a year production quota. It also was significantly faster In the quarter mile than the Chevrolet Camaro with the 305 V8, Pontiac's Firebird/Trans Am with the 305 V8 and pre-1987  302 V8 Mustangs, and equal or slightly faster than the 1987–1993 V8 Ford Mustangs and Corvettes.

1987

The 1987 Charger GLH-S was based on the 1987 Shelby Charger. Shelby Automobiles purchased the last 1,000 Chargers built and they were shipped to the Whittier factory for modification. Shelby modified the Charger using the same pieces as the 1986 GLH-S, with some changes. The differences include a non-EGR turbo, Shelby valve cover, wider Shelby windshield decal (no CS logos), different and more extensive tape graphics package, no reference to Dodge on the outer body, black/white speedo overlay, a four-digit serial numbering system on the dash plaque, wider Mobil 1 plaque installed on the radiator support, and Shelby Centurion II wheels.

Accessories

One of the most popular performance upgrades for both of these vehicles is the MOPAR Performance Stage II Computer (Logic Module).
Another popular mod was the "super 60 kit", which was named so because at full output the fuel pump as part of this kit could pump 60 gallons per hour. It included a computer, fuel pump, injectors, turbocharger and camshaft. The fuel injectors were highly sought after by not only GLH-S and later on SRT4 owners, but for Corvette, Camaro and Mustang owners because they were far better than anything that was offered on the market and were a direct fit.

References

External links

 Shelby registry

GLHS
Front-wheel-drive sports cars
Sport compact cars
Hatchbacks
Cars introduced in 1986
Cars introduced in 1987
Cars discontinued in 1987